Laura Coles (born 22 April 1987) is an Australian sport shooter. She competed in the women's skeet event at the 2014 Commonwealth Games where she won a gold medal.She also competed at the 2018 Gold Coast Commonwealth Games where she placed 9th.

Laura has been selected to represent Australia at the postponed 2020 Tokyo Olympics in Women's Skeet Shooting. She did not score sufficient points to advance past qualification.

She is married to Nick Melanko and manages a Perth-based clay target shooting experience business called Hot Shots Shooting.

References

1987 births
Australian female sport shooters
Commonwealth Games gold medallists for Australia
Living people
Shooters at the 2014 Commonwealth Games
Commonwealth Games medallists in shooting
Shooters at the 2020 Summer Olympics
21st-century Australian women
Medallists at the 2014 Commonwealth Games